Márcio Senna da Silva (born 21 May 1981) is a Brazilian former professional footballer who played as a midfielder.

Career
Senna was born in São Paulo. He moved to Grêmio Barueri of the Brazilian Série B on 16 May 2008, signing with the club on a one-year deal. On 23 July, he moved to Vaduz, signing a two-year deal, but left the club on 19 June 2009.

Senna joined Chinese Super League side Dalian Shide in July 2010.

Personal life
Márcio is the brother of Spanish former international footballer Marcos Senna and the cousin of Brazilian former midfielder Marcos Assunção.

References

External links
 
 Profile at Super League 

1981 births
Living people
Brazilian footballers
Association football midfielders
Clube Atlético Juventus players
Grêmio Barueri Futebol players
FC Vaduz players
Dalian Shide F.C. players
Esporte Clube Rio Verde players
 Atlético Monte Azul players
Chinese Super League players
Footballers from São Paulo
Brazilian expatriate footballers
Brazilian expatriate sportspeople in Liechtenstein
Expatriate footballers in Liechtenstein
Brazilian expatriate sportspeople in China
Expatriate footballers in China